Rachel Ong Sin Yen (born 1972) is a Singaporean politician and businesswoman. A member of the governing People's Action Party (PAP), she has been the Member of Parliament (MP) representing the Telok Blangah division of West Coast GRC since 2020.

Education
Ong holds a Master of Business Administration degree from INSEAD and Tsinghua University.

Career 
Ong is the chief executive of ROHEI, a learning and consulting partner operating in Singapore and Shanghai. She is also the founder and chairperson of Trybe, a registered charity aimed at helping youths.

Political career 
Ong made her political debut in the 2020 general election when she joined a five-member People's Action Party (PAP) team contesting in West Coast GRC. On 10 July 2020, the PAP team in West Coast GRC won with 51.68% of the vote against the Progress Singapore Party, so Ong became a Member of Parliament representing the Telok Blangah ward of West Coast GRC.

Ong serves in the Government Parliamentary Committees for Defence, Foreign Affairs and Manpower. She is also a member of the Estimates Committee in Parliament, an adviser to the Telok Blangah grassroots organisations, and vice chairperson of the West Coast Town Council.

References

External links 
 Rachel Ong on Parliament of Singapore
 Rachel Ong on Instagram

1973 births
Living people
21st-century Singaporean politicians
Singaporean people of Chinese descent
Tsinghua University alumni
People's Action Party politicians
Singaporean women in politics
Members of the Parliament of Singapore